White Irish is an ethnicity classification used in the 2011 United Kingdom Census. In the 2011 census, the White Irish population was 585,177 or 1% of Great Britain's total population.

This total does not include the White Irish population estimate for Northern Ireland, where only the term 'White' is used in ethnic classification and such White British people and White Irish are amalgamated. National identity is listed separately in NI, where 28.7% of those who identified as White classified themselves as Irish only or Irish with one or more additional categories (e.g. Irish and Northern Irish at 1.1%), making up a significant portion of the population.

Terminology

Census classifications
For the 2011 census, in England and Wales the ethnicity self-classification section included the category of White Irish as the second option, after White British. Where Scotland differs in the White British category, by breaking down the option into two different categories (White Scottish and Other White British); the Scottish census maintains the same naming convention, listing White Irish as the third option in the ethnic group section. In Northern Ireland, the White Irish classification did not appear, the only choice being 'White'.

National Identity is listed separately in Northern Ireland, with those who identified themselves as White in the 2011 census choosing one or more options. 'White' and 'Irish' made up 455,161 (25.1 percent) out of a total population of 1,810,863 (of all ethnic backgrounds). When including those who listed themselves as 'White', and 'Irish' or 'Irish' plus one, or more, other National Identity; there were 520,586 persons (28.7 percent). These additional White multi-identity groupings included combinations such as "White: Irish and Northern Irish" at 19,044 (1.1 percent), "White: British and Irish" at 11,684 (0.6 percent), and "White: British, Irish and Northern Irish" at 18,249 (1.0 percent).

Local government
Outside of national censuses, local governments, councils and NHS districts use the category of White Irish for statistical purposes. For example, Devon County Council has published a diversity guide which defines White Irish people as a black, Asian and minority ethnic (BAME) category. NHS Bradford District also defines White Irish as an ethnic minority group. Kirklees Council uses the abbreviation 'Ethnicity Code' WIRI for White Irish persons.

Demographics

Population and distribution

Between 2001 and 2011, the White Irish population decreased by 18 percent. Along with the White British population, the group was one of only two ethnic groups to decrease in number in the ten-year period.

As of the 2011 census, in England and Wales, London has by far the highest White Irish population in numbers and by regional proportion, numbering 175,974 inhabitants. The second highest county is the West Midlands with a White Irish population of 39,183, followed by Greater Manchester (34,499) - all other counties are below 20,000 inhabitants.

The district with the highest local White Irish population is the London Borough of Brent (4.0%). Five of the remaining districts above 3.0% are all London boroughs, namely Islington, Hammersmith and Fulham, Camden, Ealing and Harrow; the only one outside London is the unitary authority of Luton (3.0%). By total population, the district with the highest White Irish population is the city of Birmingham, where 22,021 residents identified themselves as being White Irish. The second highest district was London Borough of Brent (12,320), followed by the city of Manchester (11,843) and the London Borough of Ealing (10,428).

Below are the total populations by region.

Birthplace
In England, about 81 percent of those born in the Republic of Ireland, at the time of the 2011 census, identified as White Irish. Contrastingly, of those born in Northern Ireland, and living in England, 14 percent considered themselves White Irish. There were around 174,000 English-born people in the White Irish population of England. These individuals may be three of four generations removed from their ancestors who migrated from Ireland.

Education
In 2020 research, the White Irish ethnic group showed the largest Progress 8 benchmark performance gap between those eligible for free school meals and those not.

Religion
Statistically and nominally, White Irish are more likely to be Christian than other white Britons. According to the 2011 UK Census, White Irish are 80% Christian in England and Wales, mostly Catholic with some Anglican or other Christian. The percentage of White Irish who are Christians is lower in Scotland, at around 78%, mainly Catholic with some Presbyterian, especially Church of Scotland, and other Christian. In Northern Ireland, however, White Irish is counted simply as White, so the exact number of Christians there who are White Irish is truly unknown.

Percentages and numbers

Social and health issues

Health
A 2009 study published in Ethnicity & Health demonstrated that the grouping self-reported higher rates of poor general health than the White British populace. This was found to be particularly the case in Northern Ireland, for those who had designated themselves as White, and with an "Irish" national identity. In 2020, a UCL study based in NHS England data, showed that the White Irish group was around 50 percent less at risk of death from COVID-19 than other black, Asian and minority ethnic (BAME) groups. This was significantly lower than the White British group, which were 12 percent lower than the average risk for BAME communities.

Identity
In 2015 research, University of Southampton fellow Dr Rosalind Willis explored the social fragility of the White Irish ethnicity, particularly in England where distinctions between White British and White Irish are, at times, openly denied.

Police discrimination
In a 1995 study, sociologist Jock Young found that of 1000 randomly selected residents of Finsbury Park when were asked if they had been stopped by the police over the past year, the White Irish population was disproportionately large with 14.3%, in contrast to 12.8% of Afro-Caribbean and 5.8% of White British people. The researchers found the Police tactic of 'lurking and larking', whereby constables would wait outside Irish pubs and clubs to make arrests to be to blame for the high statistics, which was labelled a form of 'institutional racism'.

See also 
 Ethnic groups in the United Kingdom
 Demographics of the United Kingdom
 Demography of England
 Demographics of Scotland
 Demographics of Wales
 Demographics of Northern Ireland
 List of United Kingdom censuses
 Classification of ethnicity in the United Kingdom
 National Statistics Socio-economic Classification
 Genetic history of the British Isles
 Historical immigration to Great Britain
 List of English districts and their ethnic composition
 White Gypsy or Irish Traveller
 Irish Travellers

References 

Ethnic groups in the United Kingdom
Irish diaspora in the United Kingdom